Correia (Portuguese and Galician for "leather strap") is a surname of Portuguese and Galician origin, also spelled Correa or Corrêa. Correia/Correa is found throughout all of the Iberian Peninsular. 

It may refer to:

People

General

Portuguese
Paio Ramiro, noble medieval knight of the County of Portugal and who gave the family name Correia also spelled as "Correa". He was Ricohombre of Alfonso VI of León and Castile
Paio Peres Correia, Grand-Master of the military Order of Santiago
Francisco Correia de Heredia, 1st Viscount of Ribeira Brava, a Portuguese noble, political and a paternal great-great grandfather of H.R.H. Isabel, The Duchess of Braganza
Isaiah Corréia 
Berto Correia de Sousa, bank manager
Adriano Correia de Oliveira, musician
António Correia (disambiguation)
Fausto Correia, politician
Hélia Correia, writer
João Maria Correia Ayres de Campos, 1st Count of Ameal, politician, art collector, maecenas and humanist
José Correia da Serra, known as Abbé Correa, philosopher, diplomat, statesman, politician and scientist
José Homem Correia Teles, jurist, judge and politician
Nãnci Correia, singer
Luís Correia, cinematographer
Manuel Correia, Baroque composer.
Manuel Pio Correia, botanist
Natália Correia, writer
Pedro Correia Garção, lyric poet
Raúl Correia, footballer

Other nationalities
Aurelia Correia, African businesswoman
Carlos Correia, Guinea-Bissau politician and former Prime Minister
Jasiel Correia, American politician
Larry Correia, US science fiction writer
Mário Barreto Corrêa Lima, Brazilian physician and co-founder of UNIMED 
Nicola Correia-Damude, Canadian actress
Plinio Corrêa de Oliveira, Brazilian historian, politician and Catholic activist
Sonia Corrêa, Brazilian feminist activist and researcher
Veríssimo Correia Seabra, Guinea-Bissau politician and military
David J. Correira, Boston, Massachusetts lawyer and legal educator
Santos, Sergio Correia), Johannesburg, South African Business Man

Sports

Brazilian football players

Adriano Correia, known as Adriano
Haílton Corrêa de Arruda, known as Manga
Carlos Rodrigues Corrêa, known as Corrêa
Christian Corrêa Dionisio, known as Christian
Diego Pereira Corrêa, known as Diego
Kléber de Carvalho Corrêa, known as Kléber
Maicon dos Santos Corrêa, known as Maicon Santos
Marcos Corrêa dos Santos, known as Marquinhos
Nilson Corrêa Júnior, known as Nilson
Rodrigo Corrêa Dantas, known as Rodrigo Dantas
Rogério de Albuquerque Corrêa, known as Rogério Corrêa
Rogério Corrêa de Oliveira, known as Rogério Corrêa
Thiago Corrêa
Wagner Corrêa Machado, known as Wagner

Other nationalities football players

André Correia, Portuguese 
Carlos Alberto Correia, Portuguese 
Marcel Correia, Portuguese-German
Pedro Guerreiro de Jesus Correia, Portuguese
Pedro das Neves Correia, Portuguese
Rui Correia, Portuguese
Victor Correia, Guinean

Other sports
Bethe Correia, Brazilian mixed martial artist
João Correia, Portuguese rugby union player
Kevin Correia, United States baseball player
Luciano Corrêa, Brazilian judoka
Luizão Corrêa, Brazilian beach volleyball player
Maritza Correia, Puerto Rican swimmer
Pierre Corréia, French rugby union player
Rod Correia, United States baseball player

Other
Sampaio Corrêa Futebol Clube, Brazilian football club

See also
Corea, an alternate spelling
Correa, its Spanish equivalent

Portuguese-language surnames